Andrew McMaster may refer to:

Drew McMaster (Andrew Emlyn McMaster, born 1957), Scottish athlete
Andrew McMaster, an alias used by British anti-Islam activist Tommy Robinson, co-founder of the English Defence League
Andrew Ross McMaster (1876–1931), Canadian politician
Andrew McMaster (songwriter) (born 1947), member of The Motors
Andy McMaster (footballer) (1914–1998), Australian rules footballer